is a Japanese stock critic, day trader, and tarento.

Filmography

TV series

Current appearances

Former appearances

Radio

Former appearances

Bibliography

Serialisations

Former

Books

References

External links
 

Japanese critics
Japanese radio personalities
Academic staff of Meiji University
1977 births
Living people
People from Yokohama